Daday is a town in the Kastamonu Province in the Black Sea region of Turkey. It is located at 30 km west of Kastamonu. It is the seat of Daday District. Its population is 2,825 (2021). The terrain is mainly mountainous and covered with pine trees. The town is located in a valley on a small river. The economy is based primarily on agriculture and forestry products. Daday is known for its famous etliekmek, the traditional food of the Kastamonu region.

History
In the late 19th and early 20th century, Daday was part of the Kastamonu Vilayet of the Ottoman Empire.

References

Populated places in Kastamonu Province
Daday District
Towns in Turkey